Karalee is a rural residential suburb of Ipswich in the City of Ipswich, Queensland, Australia.

Geography 
The suburb of Karalee is bordered by Brisbane River to the north and north-east and by the Bremer River to the south.

History
Karalee was first named by the Queensland Place Names Board on 1 September 1973. The name Karalee is an Ugarapul  word meaning 'pretty hill beside the water'.

Karalee State School opened on 25 January 1985.

Education
Karalee State School is a government primary (Prep-6) school for boys and girls at 77 Arthur Summervilles Road. In 2017, the school had an enrolment of 566 students with 35 teachers (32 full-time equivalent) and 22 non-teaching staff (13 full-time equivalent). The school includes a special education program.

Karalee State School has three houses: Nowra, Kalara and Summerville.

Amenities 
Karalee has one shopping village with a Woolworths, a Coles, a newsagent and other stores. Karalee has a scouts base, a rugby league team, a swimming club and a tennis club.

The Ipswich City Council operates a fortnightly mobile library service which visits the shopping centre.

References

External links

 University of Queensland: Queensland Places: Karalee and Barellan Point

Suburbs of Ipswich, Queensland